Events in the year 1226 in Norway.

Incumbents
Monarch: Haakon IV Haakonsson

Events

Arts and literature

Births

Deaths
Sigurd Ribbung, nobleman and pretender to the throne (born 1203).

References

Norway